Arthur Keen may refer to:

 Arthur Keen (businessman) (1835–1915), British entrepreneur, the Keen of engineering firm Guest, Keen and Nettlefolds
 Arthur Keen (RAF officer) (1895–1918), British World War I flying ace